Trent John Durrington (born 27 August 1975) is an Australian former professional baseball player. He is primarily a second baseman. In his years as a student, he attended The Southport School located in Gold Coast.

Career
In what would turn out to be his penultimate game in the major leagues on 26 September 2005, Durrington achieved a very unusual feat: he entered the game as a pinch-runner and later struck out to end the same inning. He made his big league pitching debut in a 14–5 loss 17 April 2004 at Houston, retiring the only man he faced, Jose Vizcaino, on a first-pitch fly ball to right field. Durrington is the only Australian position player to have pitched in the Majors. , he is the only player to throw just one pitch in the Major Leagues since STATS, LLC began tracking pitch count data in 1988.

In March , Durrington played with the Australian national team in the World Baseball Classic. He then spent the regular season playing with Boston's Triple-A affiliate, the Pawtucket Red Sox. He made four career pitching appearances in the minors as well, and holds a career record of 1–1. He was released and retired at the end of the 2007 season.

Durrington's only minor league pitching win came on 5 May 2007 at Dunn Tire Park against the Pawtucket Red Sox. The win came in a game that was suspended on 23 April, but resumed nearly two weeks later. Durrington entered in the top of the 9th with the bases loaded and the Bisons losing 12–6. He walked the first two batters before retiring Luis Antonio Jimenez. The Bisons then managed to send thirteen men to the plate in the bottom of the ninth and got Durrington his only professional win with a bases-loaded walk.

In 2015, he was inducted into the Australian Baseball Hall of Fame, in the category "Special induction for players who have had outstanding careers in the game of baseball Internationally, (e.g. MLB, Asia and other areas), and made outstanding contributions to the game of Baseball who may not meet the standard criteria."

References

External links

1975 births
Living people
Anaheim Angels players
Arizona League Angels players
Arkansas Travelers players
Australian expatriate baseball players in Canada
Australian expatriate baseball players in the United States
Baseball players at the 2004 Summer Olympics
Buffalo Bisons (minor league) players
Cedar Rapids Kernels players
Edmonton Trappers players
Erie SeaWolves players
Indianapolis Indians players
Lake Elsinore Storm players
Las Vegas 51s players
Major League Baseball players from Australia
Midland Angels players
Milwaukee Brewers players
Nashville Sounds players
Olympic baseball players of Australia
Pawtucket Red Sox players
Salt Lake Stingers players
Baseball players from Sydney
2006 World Baseball Classic players